The Newark by-election may refer to:

 1943 Newark by-election
 2014 Newark by-election